Richard J. Wood is a mathematics professor at Dalhousie University in Halifax, Nova Scotia, Canada. He graduated from McMaster University in 1972 with his M.Sc. and then later went on to do his Ph.D. at Dalhousie University. He is interested in category theory and lattice theory.

References

Publications

External links
 

Year of birth missing (living people)
Living people
Canadian mathematicians
Category theorists
Lattice theorists